Trent McKenzie (born 3 April 1992) is a professional Australian rules footballer playing for the Port Adelaide Football Club in the Australian Football League (AFL). He previously played for the Gold Coast Football Club from 2011 to 2017. He was recruited as one of twelve 17-year-olds made available to Gold Coast under the AFL's draft concessions.

Junior career
McKenzie played with the Western Jets during 2009 and also represented Vic Metro in the 2009 Under-18 National Championships.  He was selected by the Gold Coast as one of twelve 17-year-olds the club could pre-list prior to the 2009 AFL Draft.  He spent 2010 playing for the Gold Coast in the Victorian Football League.

AFL career
McKenzie made his debut in round 2, 2011 in the Gold Coast Suns inaugural AFL match against Carlton at the Gabba.  In round 5, McKenzie was part of the first Gold Coast Suns victory over Port Adelaide at AAMI Stadium.  After the round 17 victory over Richmond in Cairns, McKenzie was nominated for the 2011 AFL Rising Star.

His nickname "The Cannon" was attributed by the fact that he can kick 70m on the full, making him one of the longest kicks in the AFL.

He was delisted by Gold Coast at the conclusion of the 2017 season. He subsequently signed with Port Adelaide as a delisted free agent in November.

In 2020, McKenzie was able to break into the Port Adelaide side, and has had an extended period in the side as the third tall defender.

References

External links

1992 births
Living people
Gold Coast Football Club players
Place of birth missing (living people)
Australian rules footballers from Victoria (Australia)
Western Jets players
Australia international rules football team players
Port Adelaide Football Club players
Port Adelaide Football Club players (all competitions)